David Harmon (born 10 February 1967) is an Irish wrestler. He competed in the men's freestyle 74 kg at the 1988 Summer Olympics.

References

1967 births
Living people
Irish male sport wrestlers
Olympic wrestlers of Ireland
Wrestlers at the 1988 Summer Olympics
Place of birth missing (living people)
20th-century Irish people